Harpham may refer to:
Harpham, a village in England
HMS Harpham (M2634), a Royal Navy minesweeper
Geoffrey Galt Harpham (born 1946), an American academic
Harry Harpham (1954–2016), a British politician